Eleanor or Leonor of Portugal is the name of:

 Eleanor of Portugal, Queen of Denmark (1211–1231), daughter of Afonso II of Portugal and wife of Valdemar, co-King of Denmark
 Eleanor of Portugal, Queen of Aragon (1328–1348), daughter of Afonso IV of Portugal and wife of Peter IV of Aragon
 Eleanor of Portugal, Holy Roman Empress (1434–1467), daughter of Edward I of Portugal and wife of Frederick III, Holy Roman Emperor
 Eleanor of Viseu (1458–1525), aka Eleanor of Lancaster, daughter of Infante Ferdinand, Duke of Viseu and Infanta Beatrice, Duchess of Viseu, wife of John II of Portugal
 Eleanor of Austria (1498–1558), Queen consort of Portugal (1518–1521)